The Eternal derby, also called the Romanian derby ( or ) or the Great derby, is a football match between Bucharest rivals FCSB and Dinamo București. The game is usually among—if not the most—viewed and attended of the Liga I season. The two most successful clubs in Romania, they won a combined 94 honours: a record 60 for FCSB(including two international trophies) and 34 for Dinamo București.

The teams have played 183 matches in all competitions. FCSB won 65 times and Dinamo won 61 games. The remaining 57 games have been drawn.

Background and history
The first game between the two teams was played on 21 November 1948. Dinamo won 1–0. The events are regularly marred by instances of hooliganism and frequent outbreaks of violence between rival fan groups.

The two teams are notable for their collective dominance of Romanian football. Between them, FCSB(26 times) and Dinamo (18 times) have won the Romanian football championship 44 times out of 103 completed seasons, resulting in a percentage of %. This supremacy extends also to the Cupa României (24 times for FCSB and 13 times for Dinamo), to the Supercupa României (6 times for FCSB and 2 times for Dinamo) and to the Cupa Ligii (2 times for FCSB(football)and 1 time for Dinamo).

They are also the two Romanian football teams with the best results in club competitions organised by UEFA. FCSB won the European Cup in 1986, was runner-up in the same competition in 1989 after reaching the semi-finals in 1988. In 2006, FCSB reached the semi-finals of UEFA Europa League. Meanwhile, Dinamo reached the semi-finals of the European Cup in 1984 and in the Cup Winners' Cup in 1990. Additionally, FCSB won the UEFA Super Cup in 1986, but was defeated in the Intercontinental Cup by River Plate the same year.

In recent years, due to financial mismanagement, Dinamo Bucharest has struggled, so the rivalry is not as intense as it once was.

The rivalry also extends to a number of other sports, including rugby, handball and water polo.

Honours

Records
 Largest win (all competitions): FCSB 6 : 0 Dinamo București on 12 September 2021
 Largest home win (championship): FCSB 6 : 0 Dinamo București on 12 September 2021
 Largest away win (championship): Dinamo București 0 : 4 CCA București on 11 April 1956
 The most goals in one match (all competitions): 10 in Dinamo București 6 : 4 Steaua București on 2 May 1990
 The most goals in one match (championship): 8 in Dinamo București 6 : 2 CCA București on 1 October 1951
 FC Steaua București's longest series undefeated (all competitions): 19 matches (11 wins, 8 draws) between 19 April 1992 and 22 April 2000
 FC Steaua București's longest series undefeated (championship): 16 matches (8 wins, 8 draws) between 19 April 1992 and 22 April 2000

Head to head results
{|width=100%
|width=65%|

All matches

Liga I

Romanian Cup (Cupa României)

Romanian SuperCup (Supercupa României)

League Cup (Cupa Ligii)

Players who played for both teams
Only league matches. FC Steaua București's appearances and goals adds from official book.

Managers who coached both teams
1 – still an active manager

See also
FC Steaua București–FC Rapid București rivalry
Sports rivalry

References

Football rivalries in Romania
Football in Romania
Sports competitions in Bucharest
FC Steaua București
History of FC Dinamo București
1948 establishments in Romania